The Black Mingo Group is a geologic group in South Carolina composed of dark grey to black clays, shales, laminated sandy shales, and yellow-red sands. The group's name comes from Black Mingo Creek where outcrops of the group are exposed. The bottom boundary is an unconformity with Cretaceous deposits. It preserves fossils dating back to the Paleogene period.

See also

 List of fossiliferous stratigraphic units in South Carolina
 Paleontology in South Carolina

References
 

Geologic groups of South Carolina